The Richard Wickes Greene House is an historic house in Warwick, Rhode Island.  The -story wood-frame house was built in 1849, and is an excellent local example of Georgian style.  Richard Wickes Greene was a ship's captain who acquired the property from the Wickes family in 1826.

The house was listed on the National Register of Historic Places in 1983.

See also
National Register of Historic Places listings in Kent County, Rhode Island

References

Houses completed in 1849
Houses on the National Register of Historic Places in Rhode Island
Houses in Warwick, Rhode Island
1849 establishments in Rhode Island
National Register of Historic Places in Kent County, Rhode Island